George Aytoun (1880; date of death unknown) was a footballer who played for Clydebank Juniors and Burslem Port Vale in the 1900s.

Career
Aytourn played for Clydebank Juniors before joining Burslem Port Vale in July 1905. His debut at the Athletic Ground came in a 4–3 win over Chesterfield Town on 9 September. He was only to play another three Second Division games before getting released at the end of the season.

Career statistics
Source:

References

1880 births
Year of death missing
English footballers
Association football defenders
Clydebank Juniors F.C. players
Port Vale F.C. players
English Football League players